David Roland Cook (born 2 September 1936) is a former English cricketer.  Cook was a right-handed batsman who bowled left-arm fast-medium.  He was born at Birmingham, Warwickshire.

Cook made his first-class debut for Warwickshire against Oxford University in 1962.  He next appeared for the county in first-class cricket in 1967 against Middlesex in the County Championship.  Cook made seven further first-class appearances for the county, the last of which came against Kent in the 1968 County Championship.  In his total of nine first-class appearances, he scored 108 runs at an average of 13.50, with a high score of 28*.  With the ball, he took 23 wickets at a bowling average of 23.21, with best figures of 4/66.  Cook also made a single List A appearance for Warwickshire against Somerset in the 1967 Gillette Cup.  His only wicket in the match was that of Mervyn Kitchen, while with the bat he was run out for 3, with Somerset winning by 23 runs.

Cook also played rugby union for Coventry and Warwickshire.  His brother, Michael, was also a first-class cricketer.

References

External links
David Cook at ESPNcricinfo

1936 births
Living people
Coventry R.F.C. players
Cricketers from Birmingham, West Midlands
English cricketers of 1946 to 1968
English cricketers
English rugby union players
Rugby union players from Birmingham, West Midlands
Warwickshire cricketers